The Sambyeolcho was a military unit of the Goryeo dynasty while the Choe family held the reins of power as military dictators behind puppet kings. 

Meaning "specially-selected troops", the Sambyeolcho originated from a unit called the Yabyeolcho (야별초, 夜別抄, Special Night Unit), which was established to prevent burglaries and to provide night time security in the capital. When additional units were subordinated to the Yabyeolcho, the new organization was divided into two main units, the Jwabyeolcho (좌별초, 左別抄), Special Unit of the Left, and the Ubyeolcho (우별초, 右別抄), the Special Unit of the Right.  

When a number of soldiers had been taken prisoner by the Mongols and then escaped, they were organized into a third force, the Sinuigun (신의군, 神義軍), and these three came to be known collectively as the Sambyeolcho. The Sambyeolcho performed both police and military functions but were elements of the private army of the Choe family. Choe U's private armies superseded and replaced the royal armies. The Sambyeolcho together with the Dobang (도방, 都房) comprised the means by which the Choe family military dictators projected their power after their military coup usurped the royal power. The Sambyeolcho were disbanded when the Choe military regime collapsed.

The Sambyeolcho was an army with a strong public character in combat with the police, and its conductor has also been assigned a national official such as Doryeong. As a soldier and a military officer, it was easier to move around than other soldiers. The Sambyeolcho rose in rebellion in 1270 to protest against the strong ambition of the government. After establishing its own government and fighting for three years against the government and the won, it was destroyed by the Korean-Mongolian alliance in 1273.

See also
Goryeo military regime
Sambyeolcho Rebellion
Mongol invasions of Korea

References 
 

 

Military history of Korea

Korean warriors